Sherry Miller is a Canadian actress best known for her role as Jane on the CTV drama E.N.G. (1990), as Jennifer Taylor on the Showtime drama Queer As Folk (2000–2005), and as Dorothy O'Sullivan on the Global teen drama The Best Years (2007–2009).

Biography 
Miller began her career in the 1970s as a singer and dancer, who later gained attention in Canadian television for representing Spumante Bambino wine in commercial advertisements, as well as for her role as the host of the children's television series, Polka Dot Door. She also appeared in Sofia Coppola's The Virgin Suicides. She won a 2001 Gemini Award for Best Performance by an Actress in a Featured Supporting Role in a Dramatic Program or Mini-Series for her work as Elisha Cuthbert's mother in Lucky Girl.

Miller is best known for her recurring role as Justin's mother Jennifer Taylor on the American version of Queer As Folk, during the entire run of the series from 2000 to 2005. She also appeared on the television series E.N.G. as weather reporter/anchor person Jane Oliver, and the 2004 miniseries Kingdom Hospital as sleep psychologist Dr. Lona Massingale.

Miller was also an anchor for Global Television's newscasts from 1986 to 1988.

Awards

Sherry Miller has been nominated for four Gemini awards, one of which she won. In both 1990 and 1992, Miller was nominated for Best Performance by a Supporting Actress for her role as Jane Oliver on the television show E.N.G. In 2001, Miller won a Gemini for her performance in Lucky Girl in the category of Best Performance by an Actress in a Featured Supporting Role in a Dramatic Program or Mini-Series. In 2002, Miller received another Gemini nomination in the same category, for her role as Lisa Gallagher in A Killing Spring.

Filmography
 1981 Utilities as Celebrity
 1986 Separate Vacations as Sandy
 1994 Thicker Than Blood: The Larry McLinden Story as Linda
 1995 Rent-a-Kid as Valerie Syracuse
 1995 Johnny Mnemonic as Takahashi's Secretary
 1996 Shadow Zone: The Undead Express as Mom
 1996 The Care and Handling of Rose as Brooke
 1996 The Stupids as Anchorwoman
 1996 Hostile Advances: The Kerry Ellison Story as Jean
 1996 Sabrina The Teenage Witch as Aunt Hilda
 1997 La Femme Nikita as Helen Wick
 1998 Scandalous Me: The Jacqueline Susann Story as Bea Cole
 1998 Dead Husbands as Nicole Allison
 1998 This Matter of Marriage as Donnalee
 1999 Strange Justice as Susan Deller Ross
 1999 The Virgin Suicides as Mrs. Buell
 1999-2005 Queer as Folk as Jennifer Taylor
 2000 Tribulation as Suzie Canboro
 2000 Harry's Case
 2001 Murder Among Friends as Marsha Woodruff
 2001 Tart as Jane Logan
 2001 Lucky Girl as Valerie Palmerston
 2001 Laughter on the 23rd Floor as Faye
 2002 Crossing the Line as Jennifer Blackstone
 2002 Too Young to Be a Dad as Juliana Howell
 2002 A Killing Spring as Lisa Gallagher
 2003 This Time Around as Mary Ann McNally
 2006 It's a Boy Girl Thing as Katherine Bedworth
 2008 Ice Blues as Joan Lenigan
 2014 I'll Follow You Down as Mrs. Moore
 2016 Love's Complicated as Mrs. Townsend

Television

Polka Dot Door (1971) - as Host
E.N.G. (1990) as Jane Oliver
Highlander: The Series (1994) - as Sarah Carter in the Season 3 episode, "Obsession"
F/X: The Series (1996–1997) - as Colleen O'Malley
Relic Hunter (1999) - as Sister Mary (1 episode)
Queer as Folk (2000–2005) - as Jennifer Taylor
Tom Stone (2002–2004) - as Inspector Alexandra Black 
Stephen King's Kingdom Hospital (2004) - as Dr. Lona Massingale
The Dresden Files (2007–2008)-  Season 1 as Monica Cutler / Mrs. CutlerThe Best Years (2007–2009) - as Dorothy O'SullivanjPod (2008) - Season 1 as Carol JarlewskiWarehouse 13 (2009) - Episode 1 'Pilot' as Lorna SolidayThe Listener (2009) - as Mrs Wallace (guest star S01ep11) Bitten (2014) - Season 1 (4 episodes) as Olivia McAdamsOpen Heart (2015) - Season 1 as Helena Blake Carter (2018)Schitt's Creek'' - (2 episodes) - Season 2 "Happy Anniversary" and Season 4 "Merry Christmas, Johnny Rose"

References

External links
 

Living people
Canadian television actresses
Canadian film actresses
Canadian television news anchors
Canadian women television journalists
Best Supporting Actress in a Television Film or Miniseries Canadian Screen Award winners
Year of birth missing (living people)